Deep River/Rolph Airport  is a grass strip located  northwest of Deep River, Ontario, Canada. It serves as the home base for the Deep River Flying Club.

References

External links
 Page about this airport on COPA's Places to Fly airport directory

Registered aerodromes in Ontario
Transport in Renfrew County